Magadinella is a genus of brachiopods belonging to the family Terebratellidae.

The species of this genus are found in Southern Australia.

Species:

Magadinella mineuri 
Magasella woodsiana

References

Brachiopod genera